William Landis McKinney (born August 23, 1994) is an American professional baseball outfielder in the New York Yankees organization. McKinney was a first-round draft pick (24th overall) of the Athletics in 2013. He was traded to the Chicago Cubs in 2014, and the New York Yankees in 2016. He made his MLB debut with the Yankees in 2018, and was traded to the Toronto Blue Jays during the season, with whom he played until 2020. He also played for the Milwaukee Brewers, New York Mets, Los Angeles Dodgers in 2021, and Oakland Athletics in 2022.

Career

Amateur career
McKinney attended Plano West Senior High School in Plano, Texas. He led the school's baseball team to the state's Class 5A semifinals. He committed to play college baseball at Texas Christian University.

Oakland Athletics
The Oakland Athletics selected McKinney in the first round, with the 24th overall selection, of the 2013 Major League Baseball draft. He signed with the Athletics, receiving a $1.8 million signing bonus.

McKinney began the 2014 season with the Stockton Ports of the Class A-Advanced California League. He batted .241 for the Ports.

Chicago Cubs
On July 4, 2014, the Athletics traded McKinney to the Chicago Cubs with Addison Russell and Dan Straily, in exchange for Jeff Samardzija and Jason Hammel. He was assigned to the Daytona Cubs of the Class A-Advanced Florida State League. He batted .301 in 51 games for Daytona.

McKinney began the 2015 season with the Myrtle Beach Pelicans of the Class A-Advanced Carolina League. After he batted .340 in 29 games, the Cubs promoted him to the Tennessee Smokies of the Double-A Southern League in May. He suffered a hairline fracture in his right knee in August, ending his season. McKinney returned to Tennessee in 2016.

New York Yankees
On July 25, 2016, the Cubs traded McKinney, Adam Warren, Gleyber Torres, and Rashad Crawford to the New York Yankees for Aroldis Chapman, and McKinney joined the Trenton Thunder of the Double-A Eastern League. McKinney ended the 2016 season with a .246 batting average, four home runs, and 44 RBIs. McKinney began the 2017 season with Trenton, and was promoted to the Scranton/Wilkes-Barre RailRiders of the Triple-A International League in late June. He finished the 2017 season with a combined .277 batting average with 16 home runs and 64 RBIs between both clubs. The Yankees added him to their 40-man roster after the season.

The Yankees optioned McKinney to the RailRiders at the end of spring training in 2018. An injury to Aaron Hicks led the Yankees to promote McKinney to the major leagues on March 30. He made his major league debut that day, and recorded his first hit in his first at bat. The next day, McKinney sprained the AC joint in his left shoulder, and went on the disabled list. On May 25, McKinney was activated from the disabled list and optioned to the minors.

Toronto Blue Jays
On July 26, 2018, the Yankees traded McKinney and Brandon Drury to the Toronto Blue Jays for J. A. Happ. The Blue Jays assigned McKinney to the Buffalo Bisons of the International League and promoted him to the major leagues August 17. On August 21, McKinney hit his first major league home run off Baltimore Orioles pitcher Ryan Meisinger. McKinney appeared in 36 games for the Blue Jays in 2018, hitting .252 with six home runs and 13 RBIs. In 2019, McKinney hit 12 home runs with 28 RBI in 84 games. On September 11, 2020, McKinney was designated for assignment by the Blue Jays.

Milwaukee Brewers
On September 14, 2020, McKinney was claimed off waivers by the Milwaukee Brewers. McKinney hit .207 with three home runs and six RBI in 40 games for the Brewers before being designated for assignment on May 22, 2021.

New York Mets
On May 25, 2021, McKinney was traded to the New York Mets in exchange for Pedro Quintana. In 39 games with the Mets, McKinney slashed .220/.304/.473 with five home runs and 14 RBI, before being designated for assignment on July 16.

Los Angeles Dodgers
On July 21, 2021, McKinney was traded to the Los Angeles Dodgers in exchange for minor league outfielder Carlos Rincon. He played in 37 games for the Dodgers, hitting .146 with one homer and seven RBI. McKinney appeared in four games in the postseason, primarily as a defensive replacement and only had one plate appearance, in the 2021 NLDS, in which he struck out.

On November 19, 2021, McKinney was designated for assignment by the Dodgers. On November 22, he and Zach Reks were traded to the Texas Rangers for cash considerations. However, the Rangers non-tendered him on November 30, making him a free agent.

Oakland Athletics (second stint)
On March 16, 2022, McKinney signed a minor-league deal with the Oakland Athletics that included an invitation to Spring Training. On April 7, the Athletics selected McKinney's contract, adding him to their opening day roster. McKinney was designated for assignment on May 9. He elected free agency on November 10, 2022.

New York Yankees (second stint)
On December 31, 2022, McKinney signed a minor league deal with the New York Yankees.

References

External links

1994 births
Living people
American expatriate baseball players in Canada
Arizona League Athletics players
Baseball players from Texas
Buffalo Bisons (minor league) players
Daytona Cubs players
Las Vegas Aviators players
Los Angeles Dodgers players
Major League Baseball outfielders
Milwaukee Brewers players
Myrtle Beach Pelicans players
New York Mets players
New York Yankees players
Oakland Athletics players
Oklahoma City Dodgers players
Scranton/Wilkes-Barre RailRiders players
Sportspeople from Plano, Texas
Stockton Ports players
Tennessee Smokies players
Toronto Blue Jays players
Trenton Thunder players
Vermont Lake Monsters players